Henare Pawhara "Buff" Milner (12 February 1946 – 2 March 1996) was a New Zealand rugby union player. A utility back, Milner represented East Coast, Wanganui, and Counties at a provincial level, and was a member of the New Zealand national side, the All Blacks, in 1970. He played 16 matches for the All Blacks on their tour of South Africa that year, including one international. A professional soldier, Milner died suddenly in 1996 in the United Kingdom while there on an army course.

He was the cousin of Nehe Milner-Skudder, who made his All Black debut in 2015.

References

1946 births
1996 deaths
People from Tokomaru Bay
New Zealand rugby union players
New Zealand international rugby union players
East Coast rugby union players
Wanganui rugby union players
Counties Manukau rugby union players
Māori All Blacks players
Rugby union wings
Rugby union centres
Rugby union fullbacks
New Zealand Army personnel
Rugby union players from the Gisborne Region